Abdur Rahman is a Bangladesh Awami League politician and the former Member of Parliament of Noakhali-5. He was a jute workers union leader.

Early life 
Rahman was born in Senbagh Upazila, Noakhali District.

Career
Rahman worked at a Jute mill in Narsingdi owned by Bangladesh Jute Mills Corporation and where he was a union leader. He had founded the Pakistan Jute Mills Labour Union in the 1960s.

Rahman was elected to parliament from Noakhali-5 as an Awami League candidate in 1973. He was affiliated with Bangladesh Chatkal Sramik Federation which was aligned with the Bangladesh Krishak Sramik Awami League and went into decline after the government collapsed in 1975.

Rahman was assassinated in 1981 after attending a meeting on the Labor Act.

References

Awami League politicians
1st Jatiya Sangsad members
Year of birth missing (living people)
People from Noakhali District
1981 deaths
Bangladeshi murder victims
Bangladeshi trade unionists
People murdered in Bangladesh